Minuscule 611 (in the Gregory-Aland numbering), α 250 (von Soden), is a Greek minuscule manuscript of the New Testament, on parchment. Palaeographically it has been assigned to the 12th century. The manuscript is lacunose. Formerly it was labeled by 133a and 166p.

Description 

The codex contains the text of the Acts of the Apostles, Catholic epistles, and Pauline epistles on 295 parchment leaves (size ), with lacunae (Acts 1:1-8; Romans 1:1-11). The lacking text was supplied by a later hand. It is written in one column per page, 24 lines per page, in a clear large hand.

It contains Prolegomena and pictures. The text of the Catholic epistles is surrounded by a catena.

The order of books: Acts, Catholic epistles, and Pauline epistles. Hebrews is precede 1 Timothy.

Text 

Aland the Greek text of the codex did not place in any Category.

According to Hort it has good text in the Catholic epistles with remarkable readings.

History 
The manuscript was added to the list of New Testament manuscripts by Johann Martin Augustin Scholz. It was examined by Hort and Pasinus. Gregory saw the manuscript in 1886.

Formerly it was labeled by 133a and 166p. In 1908 Gregory gave the number 611 to it.

The manuscript was destroyed by fire.

The manuscript currently is housed at the Turin National University Library (C. VI. 19), at Turin.

See also 

 List of New Testament minuscules
 Biblical manuscript
 Textual criticism

References

Further reading 

 

Greek New Testament minuscules
12th-century biblical manuscripts